Philorhizus is a genus of beetles in the family Carabidae, containing the following species:

 Philorhizus adoxus Andrewes, 1923
 Philorhizus alpinus Maschnigg, 1934
 Philorhizus atlanticus Mateu, 1957
 Philorhizus berberus Antoine, 1963
 Philorhizus brandmayri Sciaky, 1991
 Philorhizus bravoorum Mateu, 1957
 Philorhizus conicipennis Fauvel, 1905
 Philorhizus crucifer Lucas, 1846
 Philorhizus dacicus Sciaky, 1991
 Philorhizus elliptipennis Wollaston, 1864
 Philorhizus ferranius Mateu, 1956
 Philorhizus franzi Machado, 1992
 Philorhizus fumatus Mateu, 1961
 Philorhizus incertus Wollaston, 1864
 Philorhizus insignis Lucas, 1846
 Philorhizus kirgisicus Komarov & Kabak, 1995
 Philorhizus koenigi Reitter, 1887
 Philorhizus lindbergi Mateu, 1956
 Philorhizus lompei Wrase, 2005
 Philorhizus longicollis Wollaston, 1865
 Philorhizus luguricus Sciaky, 1991
 Philorhizus marggii Wrase & Assmann, 2008 
 Philorhizus mateui Machado, 1992
 Philorhizus melanocephalus (Dejean, 1825) 
 Philorhizus mendizabali Mateu & Colas, 1954 
 Philorhizus michailovi Komarov & Kabak, 1995
 Philorhizus nonfriedi Reitter, 1898
 Philorhizus notatus Stephens, 1827
 Philorhizus optimus Bates, 1873
 Philorhizus parvicollis Wollaston, 1865
 Philorhizus paulo Wrase, 1995
 Philorhizus quadrisignatus Dejean, 1825
 Philorhizus sigma (P.Rossi, 1790) 
 Philorhizus tianshanicus Komarov & Kabak, 1995
 Philorhizus tinauti Anichtchenko, 2005 
 Philorhizus umbratus Wollaston, 1865
 Philorhizus vectensis Rye, 1873
 Philorhizus vieirai Mateu, 1957
 Philorhizus wollastoni Fauvel, 1905

References

Lebiinae